Mariem Alaoui Selsouli (born July 8, 1984) is a Moroccan middle- and long-distance runner. She was born in Marrakech.

At the 2009 World Athletics Final in Berlin, Selsouli withdrew from the 1500m final after failing a drug test for EPO. She was suspended for two years by the IAAF, from August 22, 2009 to August 21, 2011. On July 23, 2012 she was banned from the Summer Olympics in London after testing positive for the diuretic furosemide, following her competition in Diamond league July 6, 2012 in Paris-Saint-Denis. She had an 8-year doping ban from 6 July 2012 to 24 July 2020.

Achievements

Personal bests
1500 metres - 4:00.77 min (2011)
3000 metres - 8:29.52 min (2007)
5000 metres - 14:36.52 min (2007)

References

External links
 

1984 births
Living people
Moroccan female long-distance runners
Moroccan female middle-distance runners
Olympic athletes of Morocco
Athletes (track and field) at the 2008 Summer Olympics
Sportspeople from Marrakesh
Moroccan sportspeople in doping cases
Doping cases in athletics
Competitors at the 2005 Summer Universiade
20th-century Moroccan women
21st-century Moroccan women